Dr. Simon Locke (on-screen title is Doctor Simon Locke) is a Canadian medical drama that was syndicated to television stations in the United States from 1971 to 1974 through the sponsorship of Colgate-Palmolive.

Plot

The series was initially a medical drama that originated from the fictional rural town of Dixon Mills, where a young physician, Dr. Simon Locke (played by soap star Sam Groom), arrived in town to assist veteran physician Dr. Andrew Sellers (played by veteran actor Jack Albertson). The plot lines were more fitting for a big city medical drama, including a typhoid epidemic, child abuse, and even a murder. The series co-starred Len Birman as Sheriff Dan Palmer and Nuala Fitzgerald as Nurse Louise Wynn.

In 1972, Albertson left the series, and the series was renamed Police Surgeon, where Dr. Locke moved back to the city and worked for the police department's emergency unit, where he assists the cops in solving crimes that require medical research. The reworked series also starred Larry D. Mann as Locke's superior, Lieutenant Jack Gordon, with Len Birman returning in his role, now as Lieutenant Dan Palmer. Nerene Virgin played Ellie the Dispatcher in over thirty episodes of the reworked series, best known for her "3-M-D-9" radio call.  The series also featured guest stars such as William Shatner, Leslie Nielsen, Donald Pleasence, and Keenan Wynn. Additionally, a then-unknown John Candy made his TV debut in the 1975 episode "Web of Guilt".

Series overview

Episode list

Season 1: 1971–72

Season 2: 1972–73

Season 3: 1973–74

Season 4: 1974–75

Syndication/current airings

While this series appeared on some stations in Canada in syndication, CTV, which co-produced this series under network president Murray Chercover, did not offer this series to its affiliates until 1972, when the show became Police Surgeon.

In December 2014, it was announced that the Retro Television Network would begin broadcasting reruns of Police Surgeon.

Filming locations

Season one episodes were filmed in the village of Kleinburg, Ontario and the surrounding area, as well as at and around the Valley Halla Estate on the Toronto Zoo grounds. Season two was shot strictly in Toronto, Ontario. One episode from season 1 was shot at the old Markham, Ontario water tower in a story involving a mute boy who dangerously climbs the tower. Other season 1 scenes were shot at Highland Creek in Scarborough, Ontario, and at the old ski hill on Twyn Rivers Road in Pickering, Ontario.

References

External links
 Police Surgeon at Canadian Communications Foundation
 Police Surgeon at tvarchive.ca
 Dr. Simon Locke at Classic TV Archive Canada
 
 

CTV Television Network original programming
1971 Canadian television series debuts
1974 Canadian television series endings
Colgate-Palmolive
Canadian medical television series
1970s Canadian crime drama television series
First-run syndicated television shows in Canada
First-run syndicated television programs in the United States
Television series by CBS Studios
Television series by Four Star Television
1970s medical television series